This page lists all described species of the spider family Eresidae accepted by the World Spider Catalog :

Adonea

Adonea Simon, 1873
 A. algarvensis Wunderlich, 2017 — Portugal
 A. algerica (El-Hennawy, 2004) — Algeria, Israel
 A. fimbriata Simon, 1873 (type) — Algeria, Tunisia, Greece, Israel

Dorceus

Dorceus C. L. Koch, 1846
 D. albolunulatus (Simon, 1876) — Algeria
 D. fastuosus C. L. Koch, 1846 (type) — Tunisia, Senegal, Israel
 D. latifrons Simon, 1873 — Algeria, Tunisia
 D. quadrispilotus Simon, 1908 — Egypt
 D. trianguliceps Simon, 1911 — Tunisia

Dresserus

Dresserus Simon, 1876
 D. aethiopicus Simon, 1909 — Ethiopia
 D. angusticeps Purcell, 1904 — South Africa
 D. armatus Pocock, 1901 — Uganda
 D. bilineatus Tullgren, 1910 — East Africa
 D. collinus Pocock, 1900 — South Africa
 D. colsoni Tucker, 1920 — South Africa
 D. darlingi Pocock, 1900 — South Africa
 D. elongatus Tullgren, 1910 — East Africa
 D. fontensis Lawrence, 1928 — Namibia
 D. fuscus Simon, 1876 (type) — East Africa, Zanzibar
 D. kannemeyeri Tucker, 1920 — South Africa
 D. laticeps Purcell, 1904 — South Africa
 D. murinus Lawrence, 1927 — Namibia
 D. namaquensis Purcell, 1908 — South Africa
 D. nigellus Tucker, 1920 — South Africa
 D. obscurus Pocock, 1898 — South Africa
 D. olivaceus Pocock, 1900 — South Africa
 D. rostratus Purcell, 1908 — Namibia
 D. schreineri Tucker, 1920 — South Africa
 D. schultzei Purcell, 1908 — Namibia
 D. sericatus Tucker, 1920 — South Africa
 D. subarmatus Tullgren, 1910 — East Africa, Botswana
 D. tripartitus Lawrence, 1938 — South Africa

Eresus

Eresus Walckenaer, 1805
 E. adaleari Zamani & Szűts, 2020 — Iran
 E. albopictus Simon, 1873 — Italy (Sicily), Morocco?, Algeria?
 E. bifasciatus Ermolajev, 1937 — Russia (South Siberia)
 E. crassitibialis Wunderlich, 1987 — Canary Is.
 E. granosus Simon, 1895 — Russia (West Siberia), China
 E. hermani Kovács, Prazsák, Eichardt, Vári & Gyurkovics, 2015 — Hungary
 E. kollari Rossi, 1846 — Europe, Turkey, Caucasus, Iran, Russia (Europe, to Far East?), Central Asia?
 E. k. frontalis Latreille, 1817 — Spain
 E. k. ignicomis Simon, 1914 — France (Corsica)
 E. k. latefasciatus Simon, 1911 — Algeria
 E. k. tricolor Simon, 1873 — France (Corsica)
 E. lavrosiae Mcheidze, 1997 — Turkey, Georgia
 E. moravicus Řezáč, 2008 — Austria, Hungary, Czechia, Slovakia, Albania, Bulgaria, Greece
 E. pharaonis Walckenaer, 1837 — Egypt
 E. robustus Franganillo, 1918 — Spain
 E. rotundiceps Simon, 1873 — Ukraine, Turkmenistan
 E. ruficapillus C. L. Koch, 1846 — Italy (Sicily)
 E. sandaliatus (Martini & Goeze, 1778) — Europe
 E. sedilloti Simon, 1881 — Portugal, Spain
 E. solitarius Simon, 1873 — Mediterranean
 E. tristis Kroneberg, 1875 — Kazakhstan
 E. walckenaeri Brullé, 1832 — Mediterranean
 E. w. moerens C. L. Koch, 1846 — Greece, Syria, Afghanistan

Gandanameno

Gandanameno Lehtinen, 1967
 G. echinata (Purcell, 1908) — Namibia
 G. fumosa (C. L. Koch, 1837) — Namibia, South Africa
 G. inornata (Pocock, 1898) — Malawi
 G. purcelli (Tucker, 1920) — South Africa
 G. spenceri (Pocock, 1900) (type) — South Africa

Loureedia

Loureedia Miller, Griswold, Scharff, Řezáč, Szűts & Marhabaie, 2012
 L. annulipes (Lucas, 1857) (type) — Algeria, Tunisia, Libya, Egypt, Israel
 L. colleni Henriques, Miñano & Pérez-Zarcos, 2018 — Spain
 L. lucasi (Simon, 1873) — Morocco, Algeria
 L. phoenixi Zamani & Marusik, 2020 — Iran

Paradonea

Paradonea Lawrence, 1968
 P. parva (Tucker, 1920) — Namibia, Botswana, South Africa
 P. presleyi Miller, Griswold, Scharff, Řezáč, Szűts & Marhabaie, 2012 — Zimbabwe, South Africa
 P. splendens (Lawrence, 1936) — Botswana, South Africa
 P. striatipes Lawrence, 1968 (type) — Namibia, South Africa
 P. variegata (Purcell, 1904) — Namibia, Botswana, South Africa

Seothyra

Seothyra Purcell, 1903
 S. annettae Dippenaar-Schoeman, 1991 — Namibia
 S. barnardi Dippenaar-Schoeman, 1991 — Botswana
 S. dorstlandica Dippenaar-Schoeman, 1991 — Namibia
 S. fasciata Purcell, 1904 — Namibia, Botswana, South Africa
 S. griffinae Dippenaar-Schoeman, 1991 — Angola, Namibia
 S. henscheli Dippenaar-Schoeman, 1991 — Namibia
 S. longipedata Dippenaar-Schoeman, 1991 — Namibia, South Africa
 S. louwi Dippenaar-Schoeman, 1991 — Namibia
 S. neseri Dippenaar-Schoeman, 1991 — Namibia
 S. perelegans Simon, 1906 — South Africa
 S. roshensis Dippenaar-Schoeman, 1991 — Namibia
 S. schreineri Purcell, 1903 (type) — Namibia, South Africa
 S. semicoccinea Simon, 1906 — South Africa

Stegodyphus

Stegodyphus Simon, 1873
 S. africanus (Blackwall, 1866) — Africa
 S. bicolor (O. Pickard-Cambridge, 1869) — Southern Africa
 S. dufouri (Audouin, 1826) — North, West Africa
 S. dumicola Pocock, 1898 — Central, Southern Africa
 S. hildebrandti (Karsch, 1878) — Central, East Africa, Zanzibar
 S. hisarensis Arora & Monga, 1992 — India
 S. lineatus (Latreille, 1817) (type) — Southern Europe, North Africa to Tajikistan
 S. lineifrons Pocock, 1898 — East Africa
 S. manaus Kraus & Kraus, 1992 — Brazil
 S. manicatus Simon, 1876 — North, West Africa
 S. mimosarum Pavesi, 1883 — Africa, Madagascar
 S. mirandus Pocock, 1899 — India
 S. nathistmus Kraus & Kraus, 1989 — Morocco to Yemen
 S. pacificus Pocock, 1900 — Jordan, Iran, Pakistan, India
 S. sabulosus Tullgren, 1910 — East, Southern Africa
 S. sarasinorum Karsch, 1892 — India, Sri Lanka, Nepal, Myanmar
 S. simplicifrons Simon, 1906 — Madagascar
 S. tentoriicola Purcell, 1904 — South Africa
 S. tibialis (O. Pickard-Cambridge, 1869) — India, Myanmar, Thailand, China
 S. tingelin Kraus & Kraus, 1989 — Cameroon

References

Eresidae